Ubly is a village in Huron County in the U.S. state of Michigan.  The population was 858 at the 2010 census. The village is within Bingham Township.

On February 25, 2004, a wolverine was spotted near Ubly, the first one sighted in Michigan in over 200 years.

Geography

Demographics

2010 census
As of the census of 2010, there were 858 people, 382 households, and 224 families living in the village. The racial makeup of the village was 98.1% White, 0.6% African American, 0.2% Native American, 0.2% Asian, 0.1% from other races, and 0.7% from two or more races. Hispanic or Latino of any race were 1.0% of the population.

There were 382 households, of which 26.4% had children under the age of 18 living with them, 41.1% were married couples living together, 13.4% had a female householder with no husband present, 4.2% had a male householder with no wife present, and 41.4% were non-families. 36.1% of all households were made up of individuals, and 17.8% had someone living alone who was 65 years of age or older. The average household size was 2.22 and the average family size was 2.88.

The median age in the village was 40.8 years. 23% of residents were under the age of 18; 8.2% were between the ages of 18 and 24; 24.5% were from 25 to 44; 25% were from 45 to 64; and 19.2% were 65 years of age or older. The gender makeup of the village was 46.2% male and 53.8% female.

2000 census
As of the census of 2000, there were 873 people, 374 households, and 235 families living in the village. The racial makeup of the village was 98.9% White, 0.2% African American, 0.1% Native American, 0.2% Asian, 0.3% from other races, and 0.2% from two or more races. Hispanic or Latino of any race were 0.8% of the population.

There were 374 households, out of which 28.1% had children under the age of 18 living with them, 48.9% were married couples living together, 11.5% had a female householder with no husband present, and 36.9% were non-families. 33.4% of all households were made up of individuals, and 14.2% had someone living alone who was 65 years of age or older.  The average household size was 2.30 and the average family size was 2.94.

In the village, the population was spread out, with 25.7% under the age of 18, 6.5% from 18 to 24, 29.0% from 25 to 44, 21.6% from 45 to 64, and 17.2% who were 65 years of age or older.  The median age was 38 years. For every 100 females, there were 90.2 males.  For every 100 females age 18 and over, there were 87.0 males.

The median income for a household in the village was $35,729, and the median income for a family was $49,875. Males had a median income of $31,765 versus $21,875 for females. The per capita income for the village was $18,140.  About 8.1% of families and 12.7% of the population were below the poverty line, including 10.7% of those under age 18 and 11.1% of those age 65 or over.

Historic building
Built in 1907 by local contractor David Pierce, the Citizens Bank Block also housed a harness shop and a library. Albert Sleeper (1862-1934), who served in the Michigan State Senate and as governor, co-founded the bank with his uncle A. W. Merrell, taking sole ownership in 1900. Sleeper owned several other banks and extensive real estate. Sleeper and his wife, Mary Moore, set up a library in the space above the bank in 1908.

Notable people

 Nicole Franzel, winner of the $500,000 grand prize on Big Brother 18, who also competed on Big Brother 16, finishing in 7th place; and Big Brother 22: All Stars, finishing in 3rd place. She also participated on season 31 of The Amazing Race with her then boyfriend(now husband), Victor Arroyo, coming in 4th place.

References

External links
Ubly Michigan

External links
 

Villages in Huron County, Michigan
Villages in Michigan